Dikorfo (also Δικόρυφο - Dikoryfo) is a small village in the region of Epirus in Greece.  The village belongs to the area of Zagori, which consists of 43 traditional villages in the Pindus mountains.

The village iss a tourist destination and its population fluctuates seasonally, from 50 in the winter to 300 in the summer.

References 

Populated places in Ioannina (regional unit)
Zagori